Cymindis binotata is a species of ground beetle in the subfamily Harpalinae. It was described by Fischer Von Waldheim in 1820.

References

binotata
Beetles described in 1820